Psychopomps is an electro-industrial band from Denmark formed by Jesper Schmidt and Flemming Norre Larsen. They were signed to Zoth Ommog Records in the early 1990s followed by Cleopatra Records. Their early records were recorded at Strip Studios by their close friend and label mate, Claus Larsen of Leaether Strip. The only notable line-up change was the addition of Kaare Mogensen for the recording of Fiction Non-Fiction. The band appeared defunct after the release of Fiction Non-Fiction, but has created a Myspace page with new content as well as old and unreleased songs.

Discography 
(All years are the original EU releases)

Albums
 1991 – Assassins DK United
 1993 – Pro-Death Ravers
 1995 – Six Six Six Nights in Hell
 1997 – Fiction Non-Fiction

EP
 1990 – More DK – (12"/EPCD)
 1993 – In The Skin

Singles
 1992 – "'Godsh*t" (containing explicit content in lyrics as mild-course language) – (12"/MCD)

Compilations
 1996 – First Blood
 2000 – The Best Of
 2014 - Infection Start 90

Soundtrack
 2004 – Saw – (song "Wonderful World")

References

Danish electronic music groups
Danish industrial music groups
1990 establishments in Denmark
2005 establishments in Denmark
Musical groups established in 1990
Musical groups established in 2005
Musical groups disestablished in 1997
Zoth Ommog Records artists
Electro-industrial music groups